Unboxing is the process of unpacking consumer products, especially high-tech gadgets, which is recorded on video and shared online. The video typically includes a detailed description and demonstration of the product. 

The first unboxing video, featuring a Nokia E61 cellphone, appeared in 2006, and searches for the term "unboxing" began to surface later that year, according to Google Trends. Initially, unboxing videos focused primarily on gadgets and fashion items. However, as the trend gained popularity, unboxing videos were available for almost all products available for purchase. By 2014, some companies were known to upload unboxing videos for their own products, while others sent products to content creators for free.

Some people believe that the popularity of unboxing videos is due to the ability to provide an authentic look at the product without any manipulative advertising. By seeing what the customer is getting, they can make more informed purchasing decisions. Some creators also add special effects or create unboxings in unique ways, such as underwater unboxings of waterproof smartphones.

The growth of e-commerce has been a major contributing factor to the rise of unboxing. Direct-to-consumer companies have sought ways to create a positive buying experience and better connect with their customers emotionally. Investing in packaging design has become a marketing asset for their products, as engaging and cool packaging is more likely to inspire customers to record unboxing videos, thereby driving more buyers to the company. Packaging manufacturers are also increasingly aware of the role that the unboxing trend plays in the development of products, continually improving their technologies to meet the demand for higher quality printed packages. As such, boxes are no longer just a transportation tool and container; they have become valuable marketing billboards that are directly delivered to customers.

Advertising 

In 2016, international fast food chain store Burger King debuted a commercial featuring Frito-Lay mascot Chester Cheetah unboxing Mac n' Cheetos.

Kid unboxing 

Kid unboxing is a YouTube format. It consists in the process of unpacking toys made by children, who are often sponsored by toy producers. After unpacking the product, the child will also assemble, describe, show how it works, and review it.

Origins of the phenomenon 
 
Kid unboxing is part of a broader phenomenon, unboxing videos. In particular since 2013 the most prominent subject of unboxing videos has been unboxing toys; the main topic of the first ones were the opening of surprise eggs.
Children are the primary target for toys channels, and the videos are shot accordingly with bright colors, quick cuts, and a happy narration. Kids unboxing videos have a loyal and global following.
Kid hosts including the child star of Ryan's World, often accidentally begin their involvement when their parents upload videos of them.

Ryan Kaji was one of the first children to start making these videos in the United States in 2015, when he was four years old. In an early clip he opened up a giant egg with more than 100 items inside; it has more than a billion views. He began making videos after watching other toys review channels like EvanTubeHD;  Evan uploaded his first video in 2011 when he was six.
On February 15, 2015, YouTube created YouTube Kids which is an app specifically developed to upload contents addressed only to children.

Key data 

Most YouTuber kids are from 5 to 10 years old. For Forbes magazine, among the top 10 videos seen on Youtube in 2018 in the US is Ryan Kaji's video. In 2019 Ryan became the top YouTube earner with $32 million USD.

List updated to July 9, 2022

The format and its variation 

Videos with kid unboxing focus attention on the toys the child is unpacking. The child assembles the toys (when it has multiple pieces) and then tries to use it, showing the item's features and explaining them. While the child's appearing in the video is essential, the presence of an adult can be active or passive. Another distinguishing element of the videos is the use of post-production elements like soundtracks, funny effects, and sounds . 
Moreover the most important feature of the format is the high involvement of emotion both shown and felt by the kids. The over exaggerated feelings are a key point, engaging the audience and attracting viewers. For example the joy of opening up a new toy for the first time is something to which people of all ages can relate. Kids love watching other children play with toys.
In addition the kid unboxing videos often take the look of sponsored videos, indeed toy companies are very likely to offer free toys to kids in exchange for them creating videos which promote their products.

Controversies 

On September 4, 2019, YouTube and its parent company Google, were required to pay a $170 million fine for violating the Children’s Online Privacy Protection Act (COPPA) law. The accusation was that YouTube illegally collected personal data of individuals under 13 years old without parental consent, in order to create targeted advertising on the platform. 
As a result of this violation, YouTube was obligated to introduce a new policy specifically for content aimed at children.

Under this policy, videos targeting children are not allowed to be monetized, and creators cannot use the comments section or receive notifications for those videos. As a consequence, content creators who have a young audience may experience a decrease in income due to the restrictions on advertising.

See also 

 Product teardown
 Haul video, videos with the related premise of showcasing and discussing recent purchases
 List of toys
 List of toys and children's media awards
 Ryan's Mystery Playdate

References

Digital marketing
User-generated content
Packaging
Merchandising
Promotion and marketing communications
Marketing techniques